Keuchishkeni is a former Modoc settlement described by the GNIS to be in Modoc County, California. Its precise location is unknown, though in 1907 it was described as a camping place on Hot Creek, near Little Klamath Lake.  
Note that Little Klamath Lake is a variant name of Lower Klamath Lake, which is in Siskiyou County, not Modoc County.

References

Modoc villages
Former settlements in Modoc County, California
Former Native American populated places in California
Lost Native American populated places in the United States